ΔΣΠ (Delta Sigma Pi) is an American professional business fraternity for men and women. It was founded on November 7, 1907, at the School of Commerce, Accounts and Finance of New York University in New York, New York and is currently headquartered in Oxford, Ohio. The Fraternity has 298 established chapters, with 224 active today.

Collegiate chapter list

Following is a list of Delta Sigma Pi collegiate chapters. Active chapters are indicated in bold; inactive chapters are indicated in italic. Many of the universities and colleges have undergone name changes since charters were granted. The most current university name is used.

Alumni chapters 
Following are the alumni chapters of Delta Sigma Pi.

See also

 Professional fraternities and sororities

References

Lists of chapters of United States student societies by society
chapters